Robert Edward Holmes (November 14, 1922 – July 28, 2004) was an associate justice of the Ohio Supreme Court from 1978 until 1992.  A conservative jurist, he had previously represented his native Franklin County in the Ohio House of Representatives from 1961 until 1968 and on Ohio Tenth District Court of Appeals from 1968 until 1978 when he moved to the Supreme Court and was replaced on the Appeals Court bench by Thomas J. Moyer.

In 1978, Governor Rhodes appointed Holmes to the seat on the Supreme Court vacated when Frank Celebrezze was elected as chief justice. He won election to six-year terms in 1980 and 1986, but was prevented from running again in 1992, because the new term would not begin until after his 70th birthday, the mandatory age limit to begin a term on the court.

He was a graduate of Ohio University where he was a member of Phi Kappa Tau fraternity and the Ohio State University's Moritz College of Law.

Holmes married Marjory Jean Holmes on August 23, 1952, and they had two sons. She died in 1977. Holmes later married Patricia S. Mishey, who died in 1999. Holmes died at home in Powell, Ohio in 2004.

References

External links

Streaming video of Holmes portrait dedication at Ohio Supreme Court, 2005
Memorial with photo in Annual Report of the Ohio Supreme Court
 

1922 births
2004 deaths
Justices of the Ohio Supreme Court
Ohio University alumni
Ohio State University Moritz College of Law alumni
Republican Party members of the Ohio House of Representatives
Politicians from Columbus, Ohio
United States Navy personnel of World War II
Judges of the Ohio District Courts of Appeals
20th-century American judges
Lawyers from Columbus, Ohio
People from Powell, Ohio
20th-century American politicians
20th-century American lawyers
United States Navy officers
United States Navy reservists